Adrianites is an extinct genus of the Adrianitidae family. They are an extinct group of ammonoid, which are shelled cephalopods related to squids, belemnites, octopodes, and cuttlefish, and more distantly to the nautiloids.

References

 The Paleobiology Database - Adrianites accessed on 18 November 2010

Adrianitidae
Goniatitida genera
Paleozoic life of British Columbia